Issoumaïla "Issou" Lingané (born 15 March 1991) is a Burkinabé footballer, who plays as a midfielder.

Career
He was transferred from Planète Champion in Burkina Faso to Académie de Sol Beni in Ivory Coast in January 2008. Then, he was promoted to the first team. After one season with ASEC Mimosas, he returned to Burkina Faso, and signed a loan deal with Rail Club du Kadiogo. Lingane played one year with Rail Club du Kadiogo, before signing in the summer of 2009 with Sabé Sports de Bouna. After one year with Rail Club du Kadiogo, he was loaned out from ASEC Mimosas to Ligue rival Sabé Sports de Bouna, before returning to ASEC Abidjan in December 2009.

Attributes
Lingané was one of ASEC's young and upcoming midfield danger men. He plays occasionally for the club because of his lack of experience, but his ability and performance at training and when given a chance to play, his confidence, passes and exuberance are signs of one of a great to come.

International career
He presented Burkina Faso at U-17 level.
He was also called up for an African Cup of Nations preparation game for the Burkina Faso national team in 2013, but he didn't make it to the final squad.

References

External links
ASEC Profile

1991 births
Living people
Association football midfielders
Citizens of Burkina Faso through descent
Burkinabé footballers
Rail Club du Kadiogo players
Planète Champion players
ASEC Mimosas players
Sabé Sports players
Hapoel Ramat Gan F.C. players
Hapoel Tel Aviv F.C. players
Maccabi Netanya F.C. players
Hapoel Ashkelon F.C. players
Adana Demirspor footballers
F.C. Ashdod players
Ivorian footballers
Burkinabé Premier League players
Liga Leumit players
Israeli Premier League players
TFF First League players
Ivorian expatriate footballers
Burkinabé expatriate footballers
Expatriate footballers in Israel
Expatriate footballers in Turkey
Burkinabé expatriate sportspeople in Israel
Burkinabé expatriate sportspeople in Turkey
Ivorian expatriate sportspeople in Israel
Ivorian expatriate sportspeople in Turkey
People from Sassandra-Marahoué District
Ivorian people of Burkinabé descent
Sportspeople of Burkinabé descent
21st-century Burkinabé people